The Phoenix is a British weekly story comic for children aged 7–
14, (though it is read by a much wider audience) published by David Fickling Comics Ltd. The comic was launched on 7 January 2012 with a preview issue which was released in late 2011. The comic is often considered a successor to The DFC: both are published by the same people and many of The Phoenix's creators had worked on The DFC.

Content of the comic
Unlike other British children's comics, such as The Beano and The Dandy, the comic does not exclusively feature humour strips. It also features serialise adventure stories such as "The Lost Boy" and "Pirates of Pangaea", as well as humour strips such as Star Cat, Evil Emperor Penguin, "Looshkin" and "Bunny vs Monkey". The comic has also featured text stories (such as extracts from books like Charlie Small and Julius Zebra) and puzzles (which are also present in both the modern Beano and Dandy). This makes the comic more similar to the older Beano and Dandy than the modern ones as they once had a mixture of adventure and humour strips as well as text stories. There is also a non-fiction strip called Corpse Talk where the creator Adam Murphy digs up a famous dead person and interviews them about their life. In 2022, Corpse Talk was adapted into an online webseries produced by Tiger Aspect.

Strips
Like a number of comics (2000AD has Tharg the Mighty and Sparky had the Sparky People), The Phoenix features a fictional editorial team, a group of cartoon animals led by feline editor-in-chief Tabitha Inkspot. The main news reporters that are Bruno Barker, Ellie Waggins, Scoop Yapski and Iris Hasselblad, who have a big news page where they report on new comics, fictional news and other (real) information of note.
The other strips include:
Bunny Vs Monkey by Jamie Smart – A strip about the adventures of anthropomorphic woodland animals, centred around a long-suffering bunny and a mischievous monkey, and many other woodland animals.
Tamsin And The Days by Neill Cameron & Kate Brown – A recurring strip starring Tamsin, an unknowingly magical girl who is the last pellar, a chosen one to save the world from darkness. Has since been discontinued.
Troy Trailblazer (Now Trailblazers) by Robert Deas – A recurring sci-fi adventure comic strip starring a team of space heroes led by Troy, their cocky but brave captain. Has since been discontinued after the strip ended.
Gary's Garden by Gary Northfield – A strip about a garden and the whimsical animals and plants in it. Since discontinued. 
Star Cat by James Turner – A sci-fi strip about a spaceship crew who live inside an interstellar cat.
Corpse Talk by Adam Murpny - A spoof talk show looking at influential historical people such as Albert Einstein, Boudicca, Isaac Newton, etc. by digging up their skeletons. Now a popular series of kids YouTube videos.
Doug Slugman by Joe List – A comic strip about a surrealist mollusc sleuth.
Evil Emperor Penguin by Laura Ellen Anderson – A comic about a penguin and his plans for world domination, with schemes that always are ridiculous, and always fail. 
Mega Robo Bros – A comic by Neill Cameron about two robot brothers on a distant future Earth. 
Squid Squad – An underwater adventure strip featuring a team of 3 squids protecting the ocean from multiple threats. Since discontinued.
Squid Bits by Jess Bradley – A simple strip of (usually, as sometimes they all follow a particular theme) unrelated short cartoons. Has recurring characters like a humanoid banana,(named banana) a cat obsessed with gravy, and a red panda, who is supposedly nature’s jerk. 
Looshkin by Jamie Smart – The adventures of "the maddest cat in the world", based around a crazy blue cat, who had previously appeared in bear. In 2022, a spin-off series, King Looshkin, was also created.
POW! – A purely illustrative comic with no text. Follows the adventures of POW!, a space gladiator and his adventures. Since discontinued.
Dirk Lloyd by Jamie Thomson – A comic strip adapted from the Dark Lord series. A Dark Lord is transformed into a 13-year-old boy and we follow his adventures as he tries to turn himself back. Since discontinued.
The Dangerous Adventures of Von Doogan by the Etherington Bros. is the puzzle usually on the back or middle page of The Phoenix. Children are encouraged to send in the answers to receive a Von Doogan prize and to be named winner in the next issue. Since discontinued.
Izzy Newton by Joe Brady & Robert Deas – featuring child genius billionaire Izzy Newton trying to make the world a much better place. Since ended and discontinued.
Claire, Justice Ninja: Ninja of Justice by Joe Brady & Kate Ashwin – Claire and hapless sidekick Nigel right everyday household wrongs such as littering or leaving the fridge open.
I Hate Pixies by James Turner & Andreas Schuster – accidental pixie king Toby gets into multiple strange pixie-related scrapes with his unusual citizens.
The Boss – The Boss and his fellow students at Lockwood Academy foil the plans of criminals. Since ended and discontinued.
Megalomaniacs by Jamie Smart - A strip about tiny aliens fighting each other for control of Earth. The strip previously ran in The Dandy and stars Megalomaniac 0002: Lord Skull. It bears a similarity to Pokemon.
Gorebrah by Joe Brady. A barbarian chef embarks on unusual food-related journeys in order to become the “greatest chef in the universe”.

The Shorts 
A collection of short comic strips including “Susie and Brad” and “Tooth and Claw Academy for Magical Creatures”. They are a relatively recent addition to the comic. Some of 'The Shorts' strips include:
Susie and Brad-About two sloths and their friends.
Doughnut Squad-A humorous strip featuring anthropomorphic doughnuts.
Tooth and Claw Academy for Magical Creatures-About a boarding school that teaches animals magic.
Doggo -About a dog that ends up in unusual situations.
Clatters and Bump-About a ghost and a skeleton who haunt a castle.

See Also 
The Dandy

The Beano

Jamie Smart

References

External links
 The Phoenix official website – http://www.thephoenixcomic.co.uk
 iPad application – https://itunes.apple.com/us/app/phoenix-weekly-story-comic/id583824799?mt=8
 Reviews of The Phoenix – https://toppsta.com/books/details/the-phoenix-comic

2011 comics debuts
British comics titles
Comics anthologies
British humour comics